Astronomical chess or Astrological chess for seven is a game from the book Libro de los Juegos (Book of Games), written under king Alfonso X the Wise in 1283. The game was played on a round board with concentric circles. The sky, zodiac signs and planets are the elements of this chess. The book described the games and problems of playing situations in chess, dice and other board games that formed the basis of modern backgammon.

In some sources astronomical chess is called the "Zodiac". As David Parlett points out in his book  The Oxford History of Board Games, the game has nothing to do with chess, but is just a kind of dice game.

References

External links 
 Rules
 Alfonso X of Castile (1221–1284)

Gambling games
Dice games
1283 establishments